Toby Myers, born Jeffrey G. Myers on September 26, 1949, is an American bass player best known for recording and touring with John Cougar Mellencamp as the bass guitarist. Myers was raised in the Indianapolis, Indiana area where he attended art school at the John Herron School of Art from 1968 to 1971. He developed an interest in music and began playing bass in a music shop next to the laundromat where his mother did the family's laundry. Myers began playing in bands in high school.

Myers lived next door to keyboard player Michael Read, one of the founding members of Pure Funk, a popular Indianapolis college funk band. Myers joined Pure Funk as their bass player in 1971. In 1974, Pure Funk had changed its name to Roadmaster. Roadmaster was a fairly successful pomp rock band which was discovered by Todd Rundgren and ultimately recorded four albums for Village/Mercury Records.

When Roadmaster's fourth album (Fortress) failed to hit the charts in the early 80's Mercury Records dropped the band. Nine months later Myers was recruited by members of John Mellencamp's band in Bloomington, Indiana to play bass for "John Cougar," as Mellencamp was then known. After only a few weeks of rehearsal with the band, Myers' first gig with Mellencamp was their appearance on Saturday Night Live (SNL) April 10, 1982. In 1983 Myers, along with Larry Crane and Mike Wanchic on guitars, Kenny Aronoff on drums and percussion, and John Cascella on keyboards recorded Mellencamp's 1983 album Uh-Huh. This was the backing band Mellencamp settled on and would retain for the next several albums. In 1988, Rolling Stone magazine called this version of Mellencamp's band "one of the most powerful and versatile live bands ever assembled."

Myers toured and recorded with John Mellencamp from 1982 to 1999. His final show with John was the sold out New Year's Eve show in Indianapolis. In 1992, Myers appeared as "Luke" in the John Mellencamp-directed movie, Falling from Grace.

Myers celebrated his 60th birthday in 2009 with a large party in Nashville, Indiana, where he now lives.

References

External links
Toby Myers

1949 births
Living people
Musicians from Indianapolis
People from Brown County, Indiana
Guitarists from Indiana
20th-century American bass guitarists
Herron School of Art and Design alumni